Pacolet Soapstone Quarries encompasses 13 historic archaeological sites located near Pacolet, Spartanburg County, South Carolina. It was the site of soapstone procurement activities during the Late Archaic Period (3000 B.C. – 500 B.C.) for the purpose of creating vessels. The quarry sites are characterized by large outcropping boulders of soapstone surrounded by depressions and concentrations of soapstone debris.

The sites were listed on the National Register of Historic Places in 1980.

See also
Archeological Site 38CK1
Archeological Site 38CK44
Archeological Site 38CK45

References

Archaeological sites on the National Register of Historic Places in South Carolina
National Register of Historic Places in Spartanburg County, South Carolina